The importance and antiquity of education in Kerala are underscored by the state's ranking as among the most literate in the country. The educational transformation of Kerala was triggered by the efforts of the Church Mission Society missionaries, who were the pioneers that promoted mass education in Kerala, in the early decades of the 19th century. The local dynastic precursors of modern-day Kerala—primarily the Travancore Royal Family, the Nair Service Society, Sree Narayana Dharma Paripalana Yogam (SNDP Yogam) and Muslim Educational Society (MES)—also made significant contribution to the progress on education in Kerala. Local schools were known by the general word kalaris, some of which taught martial arts, but other village schools run by Ezhuthachans were for imparting general education. Christian missionaries and British rule brought the modern school education system to Kerala. Ezhuthu palli was the name used in earlier times. The word was derived from the schools run by the Buddhist monasteries. For centuries villages used to setup an ezhuthupally or ashan pallikoodam with one or two teachers. Students used to go this school from nearby areas and learn languages, literature, mathematics, grammar etc. After completing this students may continue study about specific subjects such as ayurveda, astrology, accounting etc. Censuses during 1800 shows that Travancore, Cochin, Kannur areas have many such schools. Even name list of ashans were used to be published along with the census.

History

Medieval era
The Kerala school of astronomy and mathematics was founded by Madhava of Sangamagrama in Kerala mainly based at Vettathunadu (present-day Tirur region), which included among its members: Parameshvara, Neelakanta Somayaji, Jyeshtadeva, Achyuta Pisharati, Melpathur Narayana Bhattathiri and Achyuta Panikkar. The school flourished between the 14th and 16th centuries and the original discoveries of the school seems to have ended with Narayana Bhattathiri (1559–1632). In attempting to solve astronomical problems, the Kerala school independently created a number of important mathematics concepts. Their most important results—series expansion for trigonometric functions—were described in Sanskrit verse in a book by Neelakanta called Tantrasangraha, and again in a commentary on this work, called Tantrasangraha-vakhya, of unknown authorship. The theorems were stated without proof, but proofs for the series for sine, cosine, and inverse tangent were provided a century later in the work Yuktibhāṣā (c.1500–1610), written in Malayalam, by Jyesthadeva, and also in a commentary on Tantrasangraha. Their work, completed two centuries before the invention of calculus in Europe, provided what is now considered the first example of a power series (apart from geometric series). However, they did not formulate a systematic theory of differentiation and integration, nor is there any direct evidence of their results being transmitted outside Kerala.

Modern era
Education in Kerala had been promoted during British rule in India as part of their policy and also by Christian missionaries. A significant figure in the 19th century was Archbishop Bernardine Baccinelli, who started a system called "A school along with every church" to make education available for both poor and rich. That system still continues in the present. His work has resulted in the promotion of education for girls and has become a model for the educational system in Kerala after independence.

Mother Eliswa, a widow turned nun started the first school for girls in Kerala.

Before that local schools were formed by wealthy families or by teachers known as kudipallikudam where children were taught language/literature, mathematics etc. Tamil and Sanskrit were given special status while Malayalam was not given that respect. Almost all communities had members who were well educated. Artisan/trade/medical communities like Vishwakarma, Ezhava, etc., gave special interest in acquiring education. A cultural revolution happened during the second part of the 19th and first half of 20th century in Kerala and emphasis of education was part of it. Many schools and even ladies hostels were started during this period. This period also saw the popularization of newspapers, magazines etc.

The Kerala Education Act of 1958 provided for the better organization and development of educational institutions. According to the first economic census, conducted in 1977, 99.7% of the villages in Kerala had a primary school within , 98.6% had a middle school within  and 96.7% had a high school or higher secondary school within . In 1991, Kerala became the first state in India to be recognised as completely literate, although the effective literacy rate at that time was only 90%.

In 2006–2007, the state topped the Education Development Index (EDI) of the 21 major states in India. , enrolment in elementary education was almost 100%; and, unlike other states in India, educational opportunity was almost equally distributed among sexes, social groups, and regions. According to the 2011 census, Kerala has a 93.9% literacy, compared to the national literacy rate of 74.0%.

In January 2016, Kerala became the first Indian state to achieve 100% primary education through its Athulyam literacy programme. Though the cost of education is generally considered low in Kerala, according to the 61st round of the National Sample Survey (2004–2005), per capita spending on education by the rural households was reported to be  for Kerala, more than twice the national average. The survey also revealed that the rural-urban difference in household expenditure on education was much less in Kerala than in the rest of India.

Present 
Schools and colleges are mostly run by the government, private trusts, or individuals. Each school is affiliated with either the Kerala Board of Public Examination (KBPE), the Central Board for Secondary Education (CBSE), Indian Certificate of Secondary Education (ICSE), or the (NIOS). English is the language of instruction in most private schools, while government run schools offer English or Malayalam as the medium of instruction. Government-run schools in the districts bordering Karnataka and Tamil Nadu also offer instruction in Kannada or Tamil languages. A handful of Government Sanskrit Schools provide instruction in Sanskrit supplemented by Malayalam, English, Tamil or Kannada. After 10 years of secondary schooling, students typically enroll at Higher Secondary School in one of the three streams—liberal arts, commerce or science. Upon completing the required coursework, students can enroll in general or professional degree programmes. Kerala topped the Education Development Index (EDI) among 21 major states in India in year 2006–2007. In January 2016, Kerala became the 1st Indian state to achieve 100% primary education through its literacy programme Athulyam. Around 18% of the total employees in the organised sector of state, both public and private, are employed in the Educational sector as in March 2020. Kerala is also one of the Indian states which spend a larger proportion of its revenue for human resource development including educational and healthcare uplifting.Also it is mostly literate

Quality of education 

There are many Government agencies which support the quality of school education in Kerala.The Directorate of General Education is the topmost administrative wing of School Education.The other agencies are SCERT(State Council for Educational Research and Training),SSK (Samagra Shiksha Kerala),Kite,SIEMAT(State Institute for Educational management and Training).SIET(State Institute for Educational Technology).
The KITE Kerala is a state owned special purpose company under education department of the Government of Kerala. It was developed to support ICT enabled education for schools in the state. The erstwhile IT@School Project was transformed into KITE for extending its scope of operations in August 2017. Kerala is the first Indian state to have ICT-enabled education with hi-tech classrooms in all public schools. Kerala topped in the School Education Quality Index published by NITI Aayog in 2019.

A study published in 1999 by the Centre for Socio-economic & Environmental Studies stated that while the dropout rates were very low in primary schools, the same increases in the ninth and the tenth standards in Kerala. This was particularly true of SC/ST students. Schools showed that only 73% of the students joining at 1st Standard reach the 10th Standard. In the case of scheduled caste students, only 59% reached the 10th standard. 60% of Scheduled Tribe students drop out by the 10th standard.

In March 2011, 91.37% students qualified for higher studies in the matriculation Examination. The grades in SSLC examination plays an important role in the admission procedure to colleges in Kerala.

Organisation 
The schools and colleges in Kerala are run by the government or private trusts and individuals.All the schools in Kerala are under the administrative control of General Education Department and under which the Directorate of General Education is the biggest administrative umbrella.The Director of General Education (erstwhile Director of Public Instruction)is the administrative head of the school administration.  Majority of public schools are affiliated with the SCERT Kerala. There are 15,892 schools affiliated to  SCERT, of which 5,986 are government schools, 8,183 are aided schools, and the rest are either un-aided or technical schools. Each school is affiliated with either the State Council of Educational Research and Training, Kerala (SCERT Kerala), Central Board for Secondary Education (CBSE), Indian Certificate of Secondary Education (ICSE), or the National Institute of Open Schooling (NIOS), though some schools in the state do offer Cambridge International Examination's IGCSE curriculum. English is the language of instruction in most private schools, but government-run schools offer both English and Malayalam as medium. After 10 years of secondary schooling, students typically enroll at Higher Secondary School in one of the three streams—humanities, commerce or science. Upon completing the required coursework, students can enroll in general or professional degree programmes. Lots of civil service institutes are there.

Structure of School Education
In Kerala, School education is divided into 3 different stages, viz.,

Primary
Lower Primary (LP) ( Classes 1 - 4 )
Upper Primary (UP) ( Classes 5 - 7 )
Secondary
Secondary (HS) ( Classes 8 - 10 )
Higher secondary
Higher Secondary (HSS) ( Classes XI - XII ) (+1&+2)

By region

Thiruvananthapuram 
Thiruvananthapuram, the state's major academic hub, University of Kerala and several professional education colleges, including 15 engineering colleges, three medical colleges, three Ayurveda colleges, two colleges of homeopathy, six other medical colleges, and several law colleges. Trivandrum Medical College, Kerala's premier health institute, one of the finest in the country, is being upgraded to the status of an All India Institute of Medical Sciences (AIIMS). The College of Engineering, Trivandrum is one of the prominent engineering institutions in the state. The Asian School of Business and IIITM-K are two of the other premier management study institutions in the city, both situated inside Technopark. The Indian Institute of Space Science and Technology, first of its kind in India, is also situated here and an Indian Institute of Science Education and Research, Thiruvananthapuram is also being set up. Trivandrum district holds the most number of colleges and schools in Kerala including 4 international schools, 30 professional colleges, and 38 vocational training institutes.

Thiruvananthapuram is also home to most number of Research Centres in Kerala including ISRO, IISER, BrahMos Aerospace Private Limited, Vikram Sarabhai Space Centre (VSSC), Centre for Development Studies (CDS), Liquid Propulsion Systems Centre (LPSC), Thumba Equatorial Rocket Launching Station (TERLS) etc. The College of Engineering, Trivandrum is one of the prominent engineering institutions in the country. The Asian School of Business and IIITM-K are two of the other premier management study institutions in the city, both situated inside Technopark. The Indian Institute of Space Technology, the unique and first of its kind in India, is situated in the state capital.

Science and technology centres in Trivandrum 
Thiruvananthapuram is a Research and Development hub in the fields of space science, information technology, bio-technology, and medicine. It is home to the Indian Institute of Science Education and Research, Vikram Sarabhai Space Centre (VSSC), Liquid Propulsion Systems Centre (LPSC), Thumba Equatorial Rocket Launching Station (TERLS), Indian Institute of Space Science and Technology (IIST), Rajiv Gandhi Centre for Biotechnology (RGCB), Tropical Botanical Garden and Research Institute, ER&DC – CDAC, CSIR – National Institute of Interdisciplinary Science and Technology, Free Software Foundation of India (FSFI), Regional Cancer Centre (RCC), Sree Chitra Thirunal Institute of Medical Sciences and Technology (SCTIMST), Centre for Earth Science Studies (CESS), Central Tuber Crops Research Institute (CTCRI), Priyadarsini Planetarium, The Oriental Research Institute & Manuscripts Library, Chief Disease Investigation Office(CDIO) Palode, Kerala Highway Research Institute, Kerala Fisheries Research Institute, etc. A scientific institution named National centre for molecular materials, for the research and development of biomedical devices and space electronics is to be established in Thiruvananthapuram. College of Architecture Trivandrum(CAT), which specialise only on the architecture course, is another institution proposed to set up in the suburbs of the city.

Kollam 

The city of Kollam and its suburbs have plenty of educational institutes including medical colleges, engineering colleges, business management institutions, architectural institutes, state institutes dealing with fashion, design, construction studies and marine studies. The Thangal Kunju Musaliar College of Engineering in Karikode is the first government aided engineering institution after India's independence and is the first of its kind in the state. Government Model Boys Higher Secondary School and Mount Carmel Anglo-Indian School are among the district's oldest secondary schools. Amrita Vishwa Vidyapeetham is running their Schools of Arts and Sciences, Ayurveda, Biotechnology, Business, Engineering and Social Work institutions in Amritapuri in Kollam metropolitan area. Kendriya Vidyalaya is situated at Ramankulangara, Chinmaya Vidyalaya at Chandanathope, Jawahar Navodaya Vidyalaya at Kottarakkara. There are several prominent arts and science, law, engineering and management education institutions situated at the heart of the city namely Fatima Mata National College, SN College, SN Law College, Bishop Jerome Institute etc. The Kollam Government Medical College in Parippally, Travancore Medical College Hospital in Mevaram and Azeezia Medical College in Meeyannoor are the 3 medical institutions in the district.

State-owned institutions namely Indian Institute of Infrastructure and Construction, Institute of Fashion Technology Kerala, Kerala Maritime Institute and Kerala State Institute of Design are located at the outskirts of Kollam city.

Apart from colleges, there are a number of bank coaching centres in Kollam city. Kollam is known as India's hub for bank test coaching centres with around 40 such institutes in the district. Students from various Indian states such as Tamil Nadu, Karnataka, Andhra Pradesh, Bihar and Madhya Pradesh also come here for coaching.

Kottayam 

Kottayam also acts as a main educational hub. According to the 1991 census, Kottayam District of Kerala is the first district to achieve full literacy rate in the whole of India. The Rajiv Gandhi Institute of Technology Kottayam (Government Engineering college) is one among the few elite engineering institutes of the state. Mahatma Gandhi University, CMS College, K R Narayanan National Institute of Visual Science and Arts, Medical College, Kottayam, Alphonsa College, Pala, Baselious College, Kottayam, BCM College, Kottayam, BK College, Kottayam, KE College,govt college kottayam, Deva Matha college, Kuravilangad, Mannanam, KG College, Pampady, Saintgits College, Pathamuttam, St. Berchmans College, Changanasserry, Assumption College, Changanasserry, St. Thomas College, Pala, St. Dominics College, Kanjirapally, Amal Jyothi College of Engineering, Kanjirappally are some of the important educational institutions in the district. Lourdes Public School and Junior College, Girideepam Bethany schools, Sree Kumaramangalam Public School and Marian Senior Secondary School, Kottayam are the most reputed Secondary Schools in the district.

Pathanamthitta

Most of the schools and colleges in Pathanamthitta district are in Adoor, Thiruvalla, Ranni, and Pathanamthitta.

Idukki 
The District is characterised by a large migration of people from Kerala's mainland as also labourers from neighbouring state of Tamil Nadu.

Government Engineering College, Idukki, Jawaharlal Nehru Institute of Arts & Science, Kattappana, College of Engineering Munnar, College of Applied Science, Kattappana, Government College, MES College Nedumkandam, Kattappana Marian College, Kuttikanam, Mar Baselious College, Kuttikanam, are some of the important educational institutions in the district

Ernakulam / Kochi 

1. Cochin University of Science and Technology
2. Sree Sankaracharya University of Sanskrit
3. Central Marine Fisheries Research Institute
4. Kerala University of Fisheries and Ocean Studies
5. Central Institute of Fisheries Nautical and Engineering Training
6. National University of Advanced Legal Studies
7. National Institute of Oceanography, India
8. Naval Physical and Oceanographic Laboratory
9. Central Institute of Fisheries Technology

College of Fisheries affiliated to Kerala Agricultural University is situated at Panangad, a suburban area of the city. Pothanicad, a village in Ernakulam district is the first panchayath in India that achieved 100% literacy. Sree Sankaracharya University of Sanskrit (SSUS), also famous as Sanskrit University, is situated in Kalady, in the Northern side of Ernakulam District.

Thrissur 

St. Thomas College, Thrissur is the oldest college in the erstwhile princely state of Cochin and present day Thrissur district. It is also the second non-government college (Union Christian College, Aluva being the first) to be recognised as a first grade college under University of Madras, among others in then existed princely states of Travancore, Cochin and Malabar which later became mostly the present geographical area of Kerala.

Today, Thrissur acts as an important education hub of Kerala. The city has three medical colleges. It is the only district that has four universities: Kerala Agricultural University, Kerala University of Health Sciences, Kerala Kalamandalam, and Kerala Institute of Local Administration (KILA).

Kerala Institute of Local Administration is the only educational institution in Kerala where the training for IAS candidates takes place. Thrissur has Kerala Police Academy, Academy for Central Excise, Kerala Forest Research Institute, and research institutes under KAU.

The district of Thrissur holds some of the premier institutions in Kerala such as Government Engineering College, Govt. Law College, Ayurveda College, Govt. Fine Arts College, College of Veterinary and Animal Sciences, Sree Rama Varma Music School etc. Thrissur was a main center of coaching for the entrance examinations for engineering and medicine.

Palakkad

Palakkad city is home to the only Indian Institute of Technology in Kerala. Government Victoria College, Palakkad, established in 1866, is one of the oldest colleges in the state. Government Medical College, Palakkad  started in 2014 is the first Government medical college in the district. The NSS College of Engineering at Akathethara, is one of government aided engineering institution and the Fourth Engineering Institution established in Kerala . The Chembai Memorial Government Music College is one of the main centres of excellence in teaching carnatic music in the state. The Mercy College, Palakkad, established in 1964 is the first women's college in the district and one of the familiar institution in Palakkad city. Government Engineering College,Palakkad is situated at Sreekrishnapuram.

Malappuram 

1. University of Calicut
2. Malayalam University
3. AMU Malappuram Campus

The Kerala school of astronomy and mathematics flourished between the 14th and 16th centuries. In attempting to solve astronomical problems, the Kerala school independently created a number of important mathematics concepts, including series expansion for trigonometric functions. The Kerala School of Astronomy and Mathematics was based at Vettathunadu (Tirur region).

The progress that Malappuram district has achieved in the field of education during the last four decades is tremendous. Great strides have been made in the field of female education. The district plays a significant role in the higher education sector of the state. It is home to two of the main universities in the state- the University of Calicut centered at Tenhipalam which was established in 1968 as the second university in Kerala, and the Thunchath Ezhuthachan Malayalam University centered at Tirur which was established in the year 2012. AMU Malappuram Campus, one of the three off-campus centres of Aligarh Muslim University (AMU) is situated in Cherukara, which was established by the AMU in 2010. An off-campus of the English and Foreign Languages University functions at Panakkad. The district is also home to a subcentre of Kerala Agricultural University at Thavanur, and a subcentre of Sree Sankaracharya University of Sanskrit at Tirunavaya. The headquarters of Darul Huda Islamic University is at Chemmad, Tirurangadi. INKEL Greens at Malappuram provides an educational zone with the industrial zone. Eranad Knowledge City at Manjeri is a first of its kind project in the state. The MES College of Engineering, Kuttippuram, is the first established engineering college under the self financing sector in Kerala, an urban campus that extends more than a mile (1.6 km) alongside the Bharathappuzha river. The KCAET at Thavanur established in 1963, is the only agricultural engineering institute in the state. The Govt Ayurveda Research Institute for Mental Disease at Pottippara near Kottakkal is the only government Ayurvedic mental hospital in Kerala. It is also the first of its type under the public sector in the country. Kerala Ayurvedic Studies and Research Society (KASRS) under Government of Kerala is situated at Edarikode near Kottakkal. The Government of Kerala has proposed to establish one more university, Ayurveda University, at Kottakkal.

The district has the most schools as well as most number of students in Kerala as per the school statistics of 2019–20. There are 898 Lower primary schools, 363 Upper primary schools, Besides these, there are 120 CBSE schools and 3 ICSE schools.

The district also hosts a substantial amount of religious educational institutions such as Darul Huda Islamic University and Maadin Educational Academy which has more than 30 affiliated colleges throughout Kerala. Non Profit organizations like (1967) Kondotty were played a major role to implement academic upliftment in Malappuram during its early enlightenment. Now Such Institutions developed under visionaries are withstanding ages with crowns in academic development. Darul Huda Islamic Universities, Ma'din Academy and Markaz Group of institutions at Kondotty under AIC Trust are remarkable examples with numerous academic institutions in all streams of Science, Literature, Language, Commerce and Social sciences. The recent Institutions like Phase Markaz International School, Kondotty emerged under AICT are notable examples to bring education to all levels of societies to develop model citizens.

AMU Malappuram Campus is center of Aligarh Muslim University of higher education learning, located in Cherukara village of Perinthalmanna at the hills of Chelamala. It has five years Law course after 12th class, MBA and B.ed after graduation. The students can apply in the month of march for the test of these courses at AMU Controller of Exam.

Kozhikode 

Kozhikode is the major education city in Kerala which is home to three of the premier educational institutions in the country;

1. NITC
2. IIMK
3. NIELIT
4. IISR
5. CWRDM
6. KSoM

Other important educational institutions in the district include Calicut Medical College, Government Law College, Calicut, Government Engineering College Kozhikode, College of Applied Science IHRD, Kiliyand Kozhikode, College of Nursing Calicut, Govt. Dental College, Co-Operative Institute of Technology and Govt. Polytechnic College.

Wayanad

The Kerala Veterinary and Animal Sciences University is headquartered at Pookode in Vythiri.

Kannur 
Kannur district has the Kannur University; (This is a multi-campus University having campuses at Kasaragod, Kannur, Thalassery and Mananthavady – The Headquarters of the university is situated at Thavakkara, Kannur), one Government Engineering College, one Government Ayurveda College and several arts and sciences colleges. It also hosts the 13th Centre of NIFT (National Institute of Fashion Technology). The people of Kannur, with the effective leadership of Mr M.V. Raghavan established a full-fledged Medical College in Co-operative sector at Pariyaram. Kannur Medical College at Anjarakandy is a private Medical College located in this district. A private sector Ayurveda Medical College is situated at Parassinikkadavu. The Indian Naval Academy, located at Ezhimala, is Asia's largest, and the world's third-largest, naval academy. Government Brennen College, Thalassery, founded by philanthropist Edward Brennen in 1862, is one among the oldest educational institutions in India.

Kasaragod 

Kasaragod is home to the Central Plantation Crops Research Institute, originally established in 1916 as the Coconut Research Station. It is part of India's National Agricultural Research System under the Indian Council of Agricultural Research. According to the institute, Kerala "lies in the heart of the major coconut growing areas of the country." It is also home to the Indian Society for Plantation Crops, which publishes the Journal of Plantation Crops and holds symposiums on the subject. The Central University of Kerala is also located in Kasargod (Periya hills).
 The Central Plantation Crops Research Institute at Kasaragod was established in 1916. 
 The Central University of Kerala was established in 2009.
 Kasaragod is also home to Kerala Tulu Academy promoting the research on Tulu language.

See also 
 Kerala Infrastructure Investment Fund Board
 KEAM
 List of educational institutions in Kerala
 Institute of Human Resources Development
 Economy of Kerala
 Unemployment in Kerala
 Pallikoodam
 Religious education in Kerala

References

External links 

 Department of General Education
 Department of Higher Education
 Department of Architecture Education

 
Schools in Kerala